When the Summer Dies is a song by Canadian electronic music producer Deadmau5, released in 2021. It is the second time that Deadmau5 collaborated with Lights, with following Drama Free in 2018. It is an electronic dance music song featuring vocals by Lights.

Track listing

Track listing

Notes 
Originally released on July 23, 2021, as "When The Summer Dies (Alternative Mix)".
Purchasing platforms started to update the release on July 28, 2021, to the new title and artwork.

Charts

References

2021 singles
2021 songs
Deadmau5 songs
Lights (musician) songs
Songs written by Deadmau5
Songs written by Lights (musician)